The Regiment's Champion (French: Le champion du régiment) is a 1932 French comedy film directed by Henry Wulschleger and starring Bach, Charles Montel and Georges Tréville.

Cast

References

Bibliography 
 Guy Hennebelle, Mouny Berrah & Benjamin Stora. La guerre d'Algérie à l'écran. Corlet, 1997.

External links 
 

1932 comedy films
French comedy films
1932 films
1930s French-language films
Films directed by Henry Wulschleger
Films scored by Casimir Oberfeld
French black-and-white films
1930s French films